Elim is a small village in west-central Anglesey, Wales, located around  south-east of Llanddeusant and  south-west of Llyn Alaw.

It is sited close to the Bedd Branwen ring cairn.

References

Villages in Anglesey
Tref Alaw